The CN120-26,  also simply referred to as Modèle F1 (F1 model) is a French smoothbore 120mm tank gun of 52 calibers designed by the EFAB of Bourges and produced by Giat Industries .

Description
The 120 mm smoothbore gun F1 has been designed for installation in the Leclerc main battle tank.
The smooth-bore gun is chrome-plated, fitted with a thermal sleeve and has a vertical sliding breech mechanism. It is also fitted with a muzzle
reference system and the tropicalized variant of the Leclerc is fitted with a compressed air system for removing propellant
fumes.

In the Leclerc application, the gun is fed by a 22-rounds bustle-mounted automatic loader designed by Creusot-Loire Industries.
The 120 mm F1 gun fires the same 120×570mm ammunition as the German Rh-120 and American M256 smoothbore guns.
The French 120 mm F1 gun is, however, 1 m longer than the L/44 version of the Rh-120, which increases muzzle velocity and armour penetration of APFSDS projectiles; it also gives a longer effective range.

Additional specifications 

Maximum service chamber pressure: 670 MPa
Recoil effort at trunnions: 550 kN (APFSDS fired at +51 °C)
Overall weight: 2740 kg
Recoiling gun mass: 1995 kg

Operators

Current operators

See also
 CN120-25 120 mm gun: French equivalent, developed by Établissement d'Études et de Fabrication d'Armements de Bourges (EFAB) in 1979.

Weapons of comparable role, performance and era
 L11A5 120 mm rifled gun: British rifled equivalent, developed by Royal Armament Research and Development Established (RARDE) in 1957.
 2A46 125 mm gun: Russian 125-mm equivalent, developed by Spetstekhnika Design Bureau in 1960s.
 Rheinmetall 120 mm gun: German equivalent, developed by Rheinmetall in 1974.
 EXP-28M1 120 mm rifled tank gun: Experimental British weapon of the late 1970s/early 1980s. Was to have equipped the MBT-80.
 IMI 120 mm gun: Israeli equivalent, developed by Israeli Military Industries in 1988.
 OTO Breda 120 mm gun: Italian equivalent, developed by OTO Melara in 1988.
 L30A1 120 mm rifled gun: British rifled equivalent, developed by ROF Nottingham in 1989.
 JSW 120 mm gun: Japanese equivalent, developed by Japan Steel Works in 2008.
 CN08 120 mm gun: South Korean equivalent, developed by Agency for Defense Development (ADD) and WIA in 2008.
 2A82-1M 125 mm gun: New Russian 125-mm equivalent, developed by Uralvagonzavod in 2014.
 MKE 120 mm tank gun: Turkish equivalent, developed by Otokar and Hyundai WIA in 2016.

References

External links

Cold War weapons of France
Tank guns of France
120 mm artillery